The Liberal Reform Party was a rural based political party in New Zealand.

History
The party was launched as a revival of the decades earlier Country Party by the New Zealand Free Enterprise Movement in 1968 feeling that voters needed a genuine free enterprise choice in elections as, in their view, New Zealand was caught between monopoly business interests and overly empowered trade unions.

The Liberal Reform Party main goals were individual freedom, self reliance and maximised free enterprise. In addition it had other policy platforms it campaigned on:
To create a written constitution
Reducing government spending to control inflation
To hold a referendum on the issue of compulsory unionism
Establishing a petition system to allow electors to challenge legislation between elections
The abolition of payroll tax, death duties and gift duties
Inscentivising students to attend technical institutes rather than universities

The party stood 26 candidates at the  but performed poorly, winning only 0.29% of the vote with all candidates losing their deposits.

References

 

Political parties established in 1968
1968 establishments in New Zealand
Liberal Reform
Political parties with year of disestablishment missing
Liberal parties in New Zealand